Latas is a Serbian surname.

Latas may also refer to:

Latas (Aragonese dynasty), for the noble Spanish surname.
Latas, Aragon, Spain; a village in Sabiñánigo
 Lattes, Hérault, France, a commune
 PrecisionHawk LATAS (Low Altitude Traffic and Airspace Safety) drone management software

See also
 Lata (disambiguation) for the singular of "Latas"